The 1996 Icelandic Men's Football League Cup was the first staging of the Iceland League Cup. It featured 34 teams. The competition started on 14 March 1996 and concluded on 15 May 1996 with ÍA beating Breiðablik 3-1 in the final.

Details
 The 34 teams were divided into 5 groups of 6 teams and 1 group of 4 teams, with the top two teams from each group qualifying for the quarter finals. The semi finals then consisted of 2 groups each of 3 teams. The teams played each other once with the top team in each group going through to the final.

Group stage

Group A

Group B

Group C

Group D

Group E

Group F

Quarter-finals

Semi-finals

Group A

Group B

Final

See also
Icelandic Men's Football Cup
Knattspyrnusamband Íslands - The Icelandic Football Association
Icelandic First Division League 1996

References
RSSSF Page - Deildabikar 1996

1996 domestic association football cups
1996 in Icelandic football
Icelandic Men's Football League Cup